OM1 may refer to:
Olympus OM-1 camera
Multi-mode optical fiber type OM1